GE Home & Business Solutions was a division of General Electric from 2007 to 2014. In 2013 it was renamed GE Appliances & Lighting.

History

On 1 August 2007 GE announced the formation of GE Enterprise Solutions, consisting of the various GE Industrial businesses other than GE Consumer & Industrial, as well as GE Power Quality. Charlene T. Begley was named president and CEO of the division.

Operations

GE Home & Business Solutions had three primary sub businesses:

 GE Appliances
 GE Lighting
 GE Intelligent Platforms

GE Intelligent Platforms was moved under GE's Energy Management business in 2012, leaving just Appliances and Lighting.

Following the proposed sale of GE Appliances to Electrolux in September 2014, GE Appliances & Lighting ceased to exist. As of October 1, 2015, this transaction has not closed due to US antitrust action. Eventually GE Appliances was sold to Haier in June 2016. 
On 15 September 2014, GE Lighting moved under the 'Growth and Innovation' division of GE and sold to Savant Systems in 2020.

References

General Electric Industrial subsidiaries